Mykola Mykolayovych Hobdych (born March 28, 1961 in Bytkiv, Ukraine) is a Ukrainian choral conductor, known for being the founder and director of the Kyiv Chamber Choir. He founded the Kyiv Chamber Choir in 1990 with alumni of the Kiev State Conservatory.

References

Ukrainian conductors (music)
Male conductors (music)
1961 births
Kyiv Conservatory alumni
Living people
21st-century conductors (music)
21st-century male musicians